Vistlip (typeset as vistlip) is a five-member Japanese visual kei rock band that formed on July 7, 2007, and is currently signed to Delfi Sound and Marvelous Entertainment.

History
The band was reported to have been driving along Nagae Tunnel down the Joushin’etsu Expressway in Nagano city, Nagano prefecture, when the band's car, driven by the drummer Tohya, crashed into the tunnel wall at approximately 1:15 a.m. The band's manager, Asako Sakakibara (31), had been in the backseat when the impact forced her out of the car. The damage that her body sustained led to her death. According to highway police, the rest of the passengers sustained minor neck and arm injuries and no other fatalities were reported.

After the accident the band took a six-month break from their activities. They resumed their activities in February 2011.

In September 2015, Vistlip reunited with Kiryū, R-shitei and BugLug for a tour together, named 4Byoshi. In 2017, the tour occurred again.

Members 
Tomo (智) 
 Vocals
 Born on 13 January 1986 in Fukuoka Prefecture, Japan
 Band history: D'e lude → (Kuroneko Yamato) → Jessica → Replia (support vocalist)　→　vistlip & Lill
Yuh 
 Guitar
 Born on 28 July 1983 in Germany
 Band history: Желать → Sin → Jessica → vistlip
Umi (海)
 Guitar
 Born on 20 July 1983 in Tokyo, Japan
 Band history: Zeek → Replia → vistlip
Rui (瑠伊)
 Bass
 Born on 15 November 1985 in Hyōgo Prefecture, Japan
 Band history: COЯE THE CHILD (as Shunsuke) → Jessica (as Rui) → vistlip & Lill
Tohya 
 Drums
 Born on 3 January 1986 in Kanagawa Prefecture, Japan
 Band history: Rave!! → Replia (as Tomoya, support drummer), YUKiTO-Heart of Project- (as Tomoya) → vistlip

Influence 
The vocalist Tomo said that in his sixth grade days he listened to L'Arc~en~Ciel a lot and it was the band that impulsionated him to become a vocalist and then in the first grade he discovered DIR EN GREY and decided to jump into the Visual Kei scene. He has demonstrated interest in the GazettE too and some JPop artists and groups like AKB48 and ARASHI. He also like some westerns bands like Linkin Park, Limp Bizkit and Slipknot.

The guitarist Yuh said that he got in rock music through Lenny Kravitz. He also quoted Japanese bands that influenced him like X Japan, L'Arc~en~Ciel, LUNA SEA, GLAY and SIAM SHADE. Yuh was into classical music from a young age, starting with the violin to cello to guitar.

The guitarist Umi said that hide and LUNA SEA are the first Visual Kei artists he encountered. He said Rouage's major second single "Insomnia" and Laputa's major first single "硝子の肖像(Garasu no Shouzou)" got him into Visual Kei and started playing in a band. Like Tomo he also likes DIR EN GREY too and it's easy to notice their influence in most of his looks as he is the member who wears the darkest and heaviest makeup most of the time. He also likes MUCC, deadman and cali≠gari. He said that ACIDMAN and Limp Bizkit made him interested in other genres than the usual Visual Kei.

The bassist Rui is notable influenced by L'Arc~en~Ciel and hyde, he is a devoted fan. He also likes the GazettE. Some years ago he also talked about My Chemical Romance.

The drummer Tohya said that he was part of the brass band club during middle school. He also said that rhythm games was the roots of his  curiosity for music and then he got interested on bands. Like Tomo and Yuh he also likes Linkin Park, Limp Bizkit, GLAY and some JPop acts. His the member that composes the major part of the melodies and in his compositions it is easy to notice the influence of these artists, genres (JPop) and videogame music.

Discography

Singles

Mini albums

Albums

Best albums

Live-distributed singles

DVD

Tie-in

References

External links 

 

Japanese alternative rock groups
Japanese nu metal musical groups
Japanese pop rock music groups
Musical groups from Tokyo
Rap rock groups
Visual kei musical groups